Timmy Houlihan (born 9 March 1982 in Adare, County Limerick) is an Irish sportsperson.  He plays hurling with his local club Adare and was a member of the Limerick senior inter-county team at various times from 2001 until 2005.

Playing career

Club

Houlihan plays his club hurling with his local club in Adare and has enjoyed much success.  He came to prominence with the club as a member of the minor team in the late 1990s.  He won a minor county title in 1998 following a victory over Croom.  Houlihan added a second consecutive minor title to his collection in 1999 following a win over Patrickswell in the county final.  He later joined the club's under-21 team and won a county title in that grade in 2000.  Houlihan subsequently became a star goalkeeper on the club's senior team.  In 2001 the club won its first senior county title with Houlihan playing a key role between the posts throughout the entire campaign.  He added a second county winners' medal to his collection in 2002 following a county final triumph over Ahane. Adare were later defeated in their quest for a third county championship victory in-a-row.  In 2007, Houlihan spent a year away from hurling as he spent the year in Australia. Meanwhile, Adare picked up a third county title.  Adare made a fourth county title of the decade in 2008 following a defeat of Ahane, Houlihan quickly restored his place in goals for the club.  Houlihan's side were later defeated by De La Salle in the final of the Munster club final. In 2009 he won his 4th county title as Adare completed the three in a row after comprehensively defeating Na Piarsaigh in the final.

Minor and under-21

Houlihan first came to prominence on the inter-county scene as a member of the Limerick under-21 team in 1999.  It was unusual at the time as he had yet to make his debut on the county's minor team.  In 2000 Houlihan joined the Limerick minor team, however, his team were defeated in the provincial decider by Cork.

In 2000 Limerick began an unprecedented run of success at under-21 level.  Houlihan collected a Munster title in this grade that year following a 4-18 to 1-6 trouncing of Cork.  Limerick later qualified for the All-Ireland final with Galway providing the opposition.  Houlihan's clean sheet in that game proved the difference as Limerick won by 1-13 to 0-13.  It was his first All-Ireland winners' medal in that grade.

In 2001 Houlihan was appointed captain of the county's under-21 side.  That year Limerick retained their provincial title with the captain adding a second Munster title to his collection.  Once again Limerick reached the All-Ireland final where Wexford were the opponents.  In spite of leaving in two goals Limerick emerged victorious by 0-17 to 2-10.  It was Houlihan's second All-Ireland under-21 medal while he also had the honour of collecting the cup.

2002 saw Limerick reach the provincial decider once again.  After an exciting contest with Tipperary, which included extra-time, saw Houlihan's side winning by 1-20 to 2-14.  It was his third consecutive Munster under-21 winners' medal.  For the third year in a row Limerick lined out in the All-Ireland final with Galway providing the opposition once again.  Houlihan kept a clean sheet once again as Limerick powered to a 3-17 to 0-8 victory.  It was his third consecutive All-Ireland under-21 winners' medal.

Houlihan was the Limerick under-21 goalkeeper for a fifth year in 2003, however, Limerick surrendered their provincial and All-Ireland crowns at an early stage.

Senior

While still a member of the Limerick minor hurling Houlihan became first-choice goalkeeper on the county's senior team for the National Hurling League in 2000.  He made some stunning saves in the competition's semi-final, however, Joe Quaid won back his place for the championship.

In 2001 Houlihan made his first championship start in a Munster quarter-final victory over Cork.  Cork later defeated Waterford to book a place in the Munster final with Tipperary.  An entertaining game of hurling followed, however, at the full-time whistle Tipp were the victors by 2-16 to 1-17.  In spite of this defeat Limerick still had another chance at the All-Ireland title.  Wexford provided the opposition in the All-Ireland quarter-final, however, Houlihan ended up on the losing side as the men from the model county captured a 4-10 to 2-15 victory.  Following this defeat Houlihan was dropped from the Limerick senior hurling panel for 2002.

In 2003 Houlihan was recalled as first-choice Limerick goalkeeper once again.  His first game back saw Limerick draw with Waterford in a thrilling game, however, Houlihan's side were defeated in the replay.  Limerick later defeated Kerry after a stern test in an All-Ireland qualifier.  The next phase of the qualifiers saw Houlihan's side being defeated by Offaly.  After the conclusion of the campaign Houlihan was dropped from the Limerick panel for the 2004 season.

For the second time Houlihan was recalled to the Limerick hurling panel again at the end of 2004.  A draw with Tipperary in the 2005 Munster quarter-final was followed by defeat in the replay after extra-time.  Limerick later progressed through the All-Ireland qualifiers to set up an All-Ireland quarter-final meeting with Kilkenny.  Victory went to 'the Cats' on that occasion and Houlihan was replaced as first-choice goalkeeper by Brian Murray in 2006.  He did, however, make a return to championship hurling that same year when he came on as a substitute in the All-Ireland qualifier defeat by Clare.

In 2010 he made his return to the Limerick panel following a number of the 2009 panel leaving, only to leave once more before the start of the league.

Honours

Adare
Munster Senior Club Hurling Championship:
Winner (0):
Runner-up (1): 2008
Limerick Senior Hurling Championship:
Winner (5): 2001, 2002, 2007, 2008, 2011
Runner-up (1): 2003

Limerick
Munster Senior Hurling Championship:
Winner (0):
Runner-up (1): 2001
All-Ireland Under-21 Hurling Championship:
Winner (3): 2001, 2002, 2003
Munster Under-21 Hurling Championship:
Winner (3): 2001, 2002, 2003

Championship Appearances

References

 
 

1982 births
Living people
Adare hurlers
Limerick inter-county hurlers
Hurling goalkeepers